German Township may refer to:

Illinois
 German Township, Richland County, Illinois

Indiana
 German Township, Bartholomew County, Indiana
 German Township, Marshall County, Indiana
 German Township, St. Joseph County, Indiana
 German Township, Vanderburgh County, Indiana

Iowa
 German Township, Grundy County, Iowa
 German Township, Kossuth County, Iowa

Kansas
 German Township, Smith County, Kansas, in Smith County, Kansas

North Dakota
 German Township, Dickey County, North Dakota, in Dickey County, North Dakota

Ohio
 German Township, Auglaize County, Ohio
 German Township, Clark County, Ohio
 German Township, Fulton County, Ohio
 German Township, Harrison County, Ohio
 German Township, Montgomery County, Ohio

Pennsylvania
 German Township, Fayette County, Pennsylvania

South Dakota
 German Township, Hutchinson County, South Dakota, in Hutchinson County, South Dakota

Township name disambiguation pages